The Croatia national junior handball team is the national under-21/20 handball team of Croatia. Controlled by the Croatian Handball Federation that is an affiliate of the International Handball Federation IHF as well as a member of the European Handball Federation EHF, The team represents Croatia in international matches.

History
Despite being one of the strongest men's handball nations globally, Croatia have never managed to win the Crown of the IHF Men's Junior World Championship . Their best performance so far was Vice-Champions in the 2019 Edition in Spain.

Statistics

IHF Junior World Championship record
 Champions   Runners up   Third place   Fourth place

European Championship 
 Champions   Runners up   Third place   Fourth place

Squad
Last world championship squad
 01 EREŠ Ivan
 04 MALEC Lovro
 05 MILETA Fran
 06 NOVAK Dominik
 09 GODEC Karlo
 12 PANJAN Ivan
 13 VISTOROP Filip
 14 MARTINOVIĆ Ivan
 17 ŠPRUK Tomislav
 18 MILIČEVIĆ Adrian
 19 SRNA Zvonimir 
 20 VEKIĆ Josip
 21 RAČIĆ Marko 
 22 PAPIĆ Daniel
 25 ŠARAC Josip
 45 JAGANJAC Halil

References

External links
World Men's Youth Championship table
European Men's Youth Championship table

Handball in Croatia
Men's national junior handball teams
Handball